The 2021 UEFA Regions' Cup was originally to be held as the 12th edition of the UEFA Regions' Cup, a football competition for amateur teams in Europe organized by UEFA, before being cancelled due to the COVID-19 pandemic.

The final tournament of this edition would originally be held in June 2021, with the qualifying rounds originally taking place in 2020. However, on 17 June 2020, UEFA announced that the tournament had been cancelled due to the COVID-19 pandemic. Lower Silesia from Poland were the title holders.

Teams
A total of 36 teams entered the tournament. Each of the 55 UEFA member associations could enter a regional amateur representative team which qualified through a national qualifying competition, or when applicable, their national amateur representative team.

Associations were ranked according to their UEFA coefficients, computed based on results of the last three seasons (2015, 2017, 2019), to decide on the round their teams entered and their seeding pots in the preliminary and intermediate round draws. The top 28 associations entered the intermediate round, while the bottom 8 associations (ranked 29–36) entered the preliminary round.

The draws for the preliminary and intermediate rounds was held on 3 December 2019, 14:00 CET (UTC+1), at the UEFA headquarters in Nyon, Switzerland. The mechanism of the draws for each round was as follows:
In the preliminary round, the eight teams were drawn into two groups of four without any seeding.
In the intermediate round, the 32 teams were drawn into eight groups of four. Each group contained one team from Pot A, one team from Pot B, one team from Pot C, and either one team from Pot D or one of the four teams which advanced from the preliminary round (whose identity was not known at the time of the draw):
Preliminary round Group A winner would be assigned to Group 1.
Preliminary round Group B winner would be assigned to Group 2.
Preliminary round Group A runner-up would be assigned to Group 3.
Preliminary round Group B runner-up would be assigned to Group 4.
The four teams from Pot D would be drawn to Groups 5–8.

Based on the decisions taken by the UEFA Emergency Panel, teams from Russia and Ukraine could not be drawn in the same group.

The hosts for each group in the preliminary and intermediate rounds would be selected after the draw.

Format
In the preliminary round and intermediate round, each group is played as a round-robin mini-tournament at one of the teams selected as hosts after the draw.

In the final tournament, the eight qualified teams play a group stage (two groups of four) followed by the final between the group winners, at a host selected by UEFA from one of the teams.

Preliminary round
The winners and runners-up of each group advance to the intermediate round to join the 28 teams which receive byes. The preliminary round was originally to be played by 2 August 2020, but was postponed due to the COVID-19 pandemic before being cancelled.

Times are CEST (UTC+2), as listed by UEFA (local times, if different, are in parentheses).

Group A

Group B

Intermediate round
The winners of each group advance to the final tournament. The intermediate round was originally to be played by 13 December 2020.

Times up to 24 October 2020 are CEST (UTC+2), thereafter times are CET (UTC+1), as listed by UEFA (local times, if different, are in parentheses).

Group 1

Group 2

Group 3

Group 4

Group 5

Group 6

Group 7

Group 8

Final tournament
In principle, the final tournament would originally take place in the last two weeks of June 2021.

Venues
The hosts of the final tournament would originally be selected by UEFA from the eight qualified teams.

Qualified teams
The following eight teams qualify for the final tournament.

Final draw
The draw for the final tournament would originally be held in early 2021.

Group stage
The winners of each group advance to the final, while the runners-up of each group receive bronze medals.

Times are CEST (UTC+2), as listed by UEFA (local times, if different, are in parentheses).

Group A

Group B

Final
In the final, extra time and penalty shoot-out are used to decide the winner if necessary.

References

External links

Regions' Cup Matches: 2020–21, UEFA.com

2021
Regions
Association football events cancelled due to the COVID-19 pandemic